Everett, Georgia is a small, rural unincorporated community and census-designated place (CDP) in Glynn County, Georgia, United States (not to be confused with another Everett located in Thomas County).  

It first appeared as a CDP in the 2020 Census with a population of 91.

History
Robert Hammond Everett (1850-1935) of Brunswick, Georgia, once owned large tracts of timber in the vicinity and operated a lumber and cypress shingle mill near the railroad junction, which was named for him.  It was originally chartered as Everett City, Georgia in 1894, but lost its municipality status about ten years later, having failed to grow as hoped.

It was once the location of a bustling railroad junction shared by the Southern Railway (SOU) and the Seaboard Air Line Railroad (SAL), with a yard tower, freight house, passenger depot, stock yard, and about a half-dozen 'section houses' occupied by employees of these carriers.  By the end of the 1960s, all of these facilities had been removed, and by the end of the 1970s only the Southern Railway (now the Norfolk Southern Railway, NS) retained tracks through the community.  The Everett lumber mill operations closed before World War II.

Demographics

2020 census

Note: the US Census treats Hispanic/Latino as an ethnic category. This table excludes Latinos from the racial categories and assigns them to a separate category. Hispanics/Latinos can be of any race.

Education
Glynn County's public schools are operated by Glynn County School System.

Zoned schools include:
 Sterling Elementary School (SES)
 Jane Macon Middle School (JMS)
 Brunswick High School (BHS)

References

Census-designated places in Glynn County, Georgia
Unincorporated communities in Glynn County, Georgia